This article concerns the men's team; for information on the Australian women's team, see Australia women's international rules football team.

The Australia international rules football team is Australia's senior representative team in International rules football, a hybrid sport derived from Australian rules football and Gaelic football. The current team is solely made up of players from the Australian Football League.

Although Australian rules football is played around the world at an amateur level, Australia is considered far too strong to compete against at senior level. Hence, selection in the Australian international rules team is the only opportunity that Australian rules footballers have to represent their country. Until 2004, the majority of the men's Australian squad was composed of members of the All-Australian team as well as other outstanding performers from the season. In 2005, the decision was made to select players best suited to the conditions of the hybrid game, which usually resulted in a younger, smaller and quicker team being selected. However this was reverted to the All-Australian model ahead of the 2014 series. For the 2013 Series only, the decision was made to select an all-Indigenous team, known as the Indigenous All-Stars. Because of the severely limited playing pool, the Indigenous All-Stars lost by an aggregate of 101 points over the two Tests, including a record-breaking 79-point defeat in the 2nd Test.

Competing in the International Rules Series, the only team Australia plays against is the Ireland international rules football team. The series has been played intermittently since 1984. Australian under-age teams have been represented in the past, as well as a women's team in 2006. Australia last hosted the International Rules Series in 2017.

Squads

2017
1 Travis Boak (Port Adelaide)
2 Paddy Ryder (Port Adelaide)
3 Michael Hibberd (Melbourne)
4 Jack Gunston (Hawthorn)
5 Kade Simpson (Carlton)
6 Zach Merrett (Essendon)
7 Nat Fyfe (Fremantle)
8 Brendon Goddard (Essendon) – Goalkeeper 
9 Shaun Burgoyne (Hawthorn) – Captain
10 Scott Pendlebury (Collingwood) 
11 Rory Sloane (Adelaide)
12 Robbie Tarrant (North Melbourne)
14 Joel Selwood (Geelong)
15 Dayne Zorko (Brisbane)
16 Ben Brown (North Melbourne)
17 Neville Jetta (Melbourne)
18 Eddie Betts (Adelaide)
20 Chad Wingard (Port Adelaide)
21 Luke Shuey (West Coast)
22 Shaun Higgins (North Melbourne)
29 Rory Laird (Adelaide)
35 Patrick Dangerfield (Geelong)
 Toby Greene withdrew from the squad after breaking his toe, and Gary Ablett withdrew for personal reasons.
Selwood missed the first game due to an ankle injury.
Pendlebury and Ryder only played the first game; Higgins was added to the team for the second game.

2015 (Tour to Ireland)
Hayden Ballantyne (Fremantle)
Eddie Betts (Adelaide)
Grant Birchall (Hawthorn)
Luke Breust (Hawthorn)
Patrick Dangerfield (Adelaide)
Dustin Fletcher (Essendon) – Goalkeeper 
Andrew Gaff (West Coast)
Brendon Goddard (Essendon)
Robbie Gray (Port Adelaide)
Dyson Heppell (Essendon)
Luke Hodge (Hawthorn) – Captain 
Sam Mitchell (Hawthorn)
Leigh Montagna (St Kilda)
David Mundy (Fremantle)
Robert Murphy (Western Bulldogs)
Nick Riewoldt (St Kilda)
Tom Rockliff (Brisbane Lions)
Jarryd Roughead (Hawthorn)
Nick Smith (Sydney Swans)
Jake Stringer (Western Bulldogs)
Harry Taylor (Geelong)
Easton Wood (Western Bulldogs)
 Coach – Alastair Clarkson
Jim Stynes Medal: Harry Taylor

2014
 Grant Birchall (Hawthorn)
 Travis Boak (Port Adelaide)
 Luke Breust (Hawthorn)
 Patrick Dangerfield (Adelaide)
 Dustin Fletcher (Essendon) – Goalkeeper
 Nathan Fyfe (Fremantle)
 Brendon Goddard (Essendon)
 Robbie Gray (Port Adelaide)
 Brent Harvey (North Melbourne)
 Luke Hodge (Hawthorn)
 Kieren Jack (Sydney)
 Steve Johnson (Geelong)
 Jarrad McVeigh (Sydney)
 Sam Mitchell (Hawthorn)
 Leigh Montagna (St Kilda)
 Nic Naitanui (West Coast)
 Nick Riewoldt (St Kilda)
 Tom Rockliff (Brisbane Lions)
 Joel Selwood (Geelong) – Captain
 Brodie Smith (Adelaide)
 Harry Taylor (Geelong)
 Jobe Watson (Essendon)
 Chad Wingard (Port Adelaide)
 Coach – Alastair Clarkson
Jim Stynes Medal: Luke Hodge

2013 (Tour to Ireland)
 Tony Armstrong (Sydney Swans)
 Dom Barry (Melbourne)
 Eddie Betts (Carlton)
 Aaron Davey (Melbourne)
 Alwyn Davey (Essendon)
 Shaun Edwards (Greater Western Sydney)
 Cam Ellis-Yolmen (Adelaide Crows)
 Lance Franklin (Sydney Swans)
 Jarrod Harbrow (Gold Coast Suns)
 Josh Hill (West Coast Eagles)
 Lewis Jetta (Sydney Swans)
 Nathan Lovett-Murray (Essendon)
 Ashley McGrath (Brisbane Lions) – Goalkeeper
 Steven Motlop (Geelong Cats)
 Jake Neade (Port Adelaide)
 Mathew Stokes (Geelong Cats)
 Lindsay Thomas (North Melbourne)
 Sharrod Wellingham (West Coast Eagles)
 Daniel Wells (North Melbourne) – Captain
 Chris Yarran (Carlton)
Coach – Michael O'Loughlin
Jim Stynes Medal: Ashley McGrath

2011
Richard Douglas
James Frawley
Robbie Gray
Brad Green – Captain
Shaun Grigg
James Kelly
Jake King
Ben McGlynn
Trent McKenzie
Stephen Milne
Angus Monfries
Robin Nahas
Mark Nicoski
Mitch Robinson
Liam Shiels
Zac Smith
Matt Suckling – Goalkeeper
Andrew Swallow
Jack Trengove
Bernie Vince
Callan Ward
David Wojcinski
Easton Wood
Joel Patfull
Coach – Rodney Eade
Jim Stynes Medal: James Kelly

2010 (Tour to Ireland)

Todd Banfield (Brisbane Lions)
Eddie Betts (Carlton)
Matthew Boyd (Western Bulldogs)
Daniel Cross (Western Bulldogs)
Patrick Dangerfield (Adelaide Crows)
Paul Duffield (Fremantle)
Dustin Fletcher (Essendon) – Goalkeeper
James Frawley (Melbourne)
Bryce Gibbs (Carlton)
Sam Gilbert (St Kilda)
Tyson Goldsack (Collingwood)
Adam Goodes (Sydney Swans) – Captain
Brad Green (Melbourne)
Garrick Ibbotson (Fremantle)
Kieren Jack (Sydney Swans)
Jarrad McVeigh (Sydney Swans)
Leigh Montagna (St Kilda)
Liam Picken (Western Bulldogs)
Jack Riewoldt (Richmond)
Kade Simpson (Carlton)
Dane Swan (Collingwood)
Travis Varcoe (Geelong Cats)
David Wojcinski (Geelong Cats)
 Coach – Mick Malthouse (Collingwood)
Jim Stynes Medal: Dane Swan

2008
 Nathan Bock (Adelaide) – Goalkeeper #1
 Matthew Boyd (Western Bulldogs)
 Jared Brennan (Brisbane)
 Campbell Brown (Hawthorn)
 Shaun Burgoyne (Port Adelaide)
 Matt Campbell (North Melbourne)
 Ryan Crowley (Fremantle)
 Michael Firrito (North Melbourne) – Goalkeeper #2
 Nathan Foley (Richmond)
 Brent Harvey (North Melbourne) – Captain
 Roger Hayden (Fremantle)
 Josh Hunt (Geelong)*
 Leigh Montagna (St Kilda)
 Daniel Motlop (Port Adelaide)
 Marc Murphy (Carlton)
 Michael Osborne (Hawthorn)
 Scott Pendlebury (Collingwood)
 Drew Petrie (North Melbourne)
 David Rodan (Port Adelaide)
 Max Rooke (Geelong)*
 Brad Sewell (Hawthorn)
 Kade Simpson (Carlton)
 Adam Selwood (West Coast) – Vice Captain
 Dale Thomas (Collingwood)
 Scott Thompson (Adelaide)
 Daniel Wells (North Melbourne)
 Coach – Mick Malthouse (Collingwood)
Jim Stynes Medal: Kade Simpson

*Max Rooke was named in the initial squad, but did not play due to illness.  He was replaced in the squad for the second game by Josh Hunt.

2006 (Tour to Ireland)
1 Barry Hall (Sydney) – Co-Captain
2 Nick Davis (Sydney)
3 Michael Voss (Brisbane)
4 Andrew Raines (Richmond)
5 Ryan O'Keefe (Sydney)
6 Kade Simpson (Carlton)
7 Brett Peake (Fremantle)***
8 Brendon Goddard (St Kilda)
9 Lindsay Gilbee (Western Bulldogs) **
10 Chance Bateman (Hawthorn)
11 Justin Sherman (Brisbane)
12 Matthew Lappin (Carlton)
13 Adam Schneider (Sydney)
15 Ryan Crowley (Fremantle)
16 Danyle Pearce (Port Adelaide)
18 Graham Johncock (Adelaide)
21 David Mundy (Fremantle)***
23 James McDonald (Melbourne)
24 Brent Stanton (Essendon)
25 Brendan Fevola (Carlton)*
26 Samuel Fisher (St Kilda) **
30 Campbell Brown (Hawthorn)
31 Dustin Fletcher (Essendon) – Goalkeeper / Co-Captain
36 Aaron Davey (Melbourne)
37 Adam Selwood (West Coast)
Coach – Kevin Sheedy (Essendon)

Jim Stynes Medal – Ryan O'Keefe

*Brendan Fevola was an emergency for the first game, but was sent home before the second game due to misconduct in that he was involved in a fight at a pub.

**Lindsay Gilbee and Sam Fisher only played in the first game.

***Brett Peake and David Mundy only played in the second game.

2005
Coach – Kevin Sheedy (Essendon)
2 Chris Johnson (Brisbane Lions) – Co-Captain
3 Brett Deledio (Richmond)
5 Ryan O'Keefe (Sydney Swans)
6 Shannon Grant (Kangaroos)
7 Nick Davis (Sydney Swans)
8 Daniel Wells (Kangaroos)
9 Lindsay Gilbee (Western Bulldogs)
10 Nathan Eagleton (Western Bulldogs)
12 Matthew Lappin (Carlton)
13 Daniel Giansiracusa (Western Bulldogs)
15 Luke Hodge (Hawthorn)
16 Kepler Bradley (Essendon)
18 Troy Makepeace (Kangaroos)
21 Heath Black (Fremantle)
22 Brent Moloney (Melbourne)
23 Andrew McLeod (Adelaide) – Co-Captain
24 Trent Croad (Hawthorn)
29 Brent Harvey (Kangaroos)
30 Jarrad Waite (Carlton)
31 Dustin Fletcher (Essendon) – Goalkeeper
32 Amon Buchanan (Sydney Swans)
33 Russell Robertson (Melbourne)
35 Chris Newman (Richmond)
36 Aaron Davey (Melbourne)
38 Dale Morris (Western Bulldogs)
39 Darren Milburn (Geelong)
41 Andrew Lovett (Essendon)

Jim Stynes Medal – Andrew McLeod

2004 (Tour to Ireland)

Luke Ball (St Kilda)
Craig Bolton (Sydney)
Jude Bolton (Sydney)
Joel Bowden (Richmond)
Michael Braun (West Coast)
Nathan Brown (Richmond)
Cameron Bruce (Melbourne)
Joel Corey (Geelong)
Jared Crouch (Sydney)
Nick Dal Santo (St Kilda)
Alan Didak (Collingwood)
Andrew Embley (West Coast)
Brad Green (Melbourne)
Robert Haddrill (Fremantle)
James Hird – Captain (Essendon)
Max Hudghton (St Kilda)
Jason Johnson (Essendon)
Austinn Jones (St Kilda)
Brett Kirk (Sydney)
Adam McPhee (Essendon)
Mark McVeigh (Essendon)
Mal Michael (Brisbane Lions) – goalkeeper
Brady Rawlings (Kangaroos)
Nick Riewoldt (St Kilda)
Dean Solomon (Essendon)

Jim Stynes Medal – Nathan Brown

2003
Coach:Garry Lyon
Leo Barry (Sydney)
Peter F. Bell (Fremantle)
Mark Bickley (Adelaide)
Clint Bizzell (Melbourne)
Nathan Brown (Richmond)
Peter Burgoyne (Port Adelaide)
Matthew Carr (Fremantle)
Jared Crouch (Sydney)
Shane Crawford (Hawthorn)
Barry Hall (Sydney)
Brent Harvey (Kangaroos)
Paul Hasleby (Fremantle)
Lenny Hayes (St Kilda)
Glen Jakovich – Goalkeeper (West Coast)
Brad Johnson (Western Bulldogs)
Chris Johnson (Brisbane)
Brett Kirk (Sydney)
Robert Murphy (Western Bulldogs)
Matthew Pavlich (Fremantle)
Luke Power (Brisbane)
Jade Rawlings (Hawthorn)
Matthew Scarlett (Geelong)
Adam Simpson (Kangaroos)
Rohan Smith (Western Bulldogs)
Daniel Wells (Kangaroos)
David Wirrpanda (West Coast)

Jim Stynes Medal – Brent Harvey

2002 (Tour to Ireland)
Mark Bickley (Adelaide)
Craig Bradley (Carlton)
Nathan Brown (Western Bulldogs)
Cameron Bruce (Melbourne)
James Clement (Collingwood)
Chad Cornes (Port Adelaide)
Shane Crawford (Captain) (Hawthorn)
Luke Darcy (Western Bulldogs)
Tyson Edwards (Adelaide)
Josh Francou (Port Adelaide)
Chris Johnson (Brisbane)
Chris Judd (West Coast)
Andrew Kellaway Goalkeeper (Richmond)
Daniel Kerr (West Coast)
Angelo Lekkas (Hawthorn)
Cameron Ling (Geelong)
Stephen Milne (St Kilda)
Brett Montgomery (Port Adelaide)
Robert Murphy (Western Bulldogs)
David Neitz (vice-captain) (Melbourne)
Matthew Pavlich (Fremantle)
Matthew Primus (Port Adelaide)
Matthew Scarlett (Geelong)
Brad Scott (Brisbane)
Adam Simpson (Kangaroos)
Warren Tredrea (Port Adelaide)
Adem Yze (Melbourne)

Jim Stynes Medal: Andrew Kellaway

2001
Coach – Garry Lyon
2 Darren Gaspar (Richmond)
3 Michael Voss – Captain (Brisbane)
5 Brad Ottens (Richmond)
6 Jonathan Hay (Hawthorn)
8 Joel Bowden (Richmond)
9 Stuart Maxfield (Sydney)
10 Josh Francou (Port Adelaide)
11 Joel Smith (Hawthorn)
12 Matthew Lappin (Carlton)
14 Jason Johnson (Essendon)
15 Matthew Nicks (Sydney)
16 Warren Tredrea (Port Adelaide)
17 Daniel Chick (Hawthorn)
18 Matthew Lloyd (Essendon)
19 Nick Stevens (Port Adelaide)
20 Simon Black (Brisbane)
21 Craig Bradley (Carlton)
23 Andrew McLeod (Adelaide)
24 Darryl White (Brisbane)
25 Damien Hardwick (Essendon)
26 Adam Ramanauskas (Essendon)
29 Brent Harvey (Kangaroos)
33 Blake Caracella (Essendon)
34 David King (Kangaroos)
36 Simon Goodwin – Goalkeeper (Adelaide)
37 Adam Goodes (Sydney)
44 Nigel Lappin (Brisbane)

Jim Stynes Medal – Matthew Lloyd

2000 (Tour to Ireland)
 Jason Akermanis (Brisbane)
 Justin Blumfield (Essendon)
 Craig Bradley (Carlton)
 Nathan Brown (Western Bulldogs)
 Wayne Campbell (Richmond)
 Blake Caracella (Essendon)
 Trent Croad (Hawthorn)
 Simon Goodwin (Adelaide)
 Damien Hardwick (Essendon)
 Brent Harvey (Kangaroos)
 Chris Heffernan (Essendon)
 James Hird – Captain (Essendon)
 Brad Johnson (Western Bulldogs)
 Andrew Kellaway – goalkeeper (Richmond)
 David King (Kangaroos)
 Steven King (Geelong)
 Justin Leppitsch (Brisbane)
 Andrew McLeod (Adelaide)
 Michael O'Loughlin (Sydney)
 Luke Power (Brisbane)
 Brett Ratten (Carlton)
 Mark Ricciuto (Adelaide)
 Rohan H. Smith (Western Bulldogs)
 Scott West (Western Bulldogs)
 Shane Woewodin (Melbourne)
 Adem Yze (Melbourne)

Jim Stynes Medal – James Hird

1999 
Coach – Dermott Brereton
Assistant coach – Jim Stynes
1 Stephen Silvagni – Goalkeeper
3 Ben Graham
4 Craig McRae
5 Nathan Buckley – Captain
6 Rohan Smith
7 Scott West
8 Trent Croad
9 Shane Crawford
10 Marcus Ashcroft
11 Nathan Burke
12 Jason Akermanis
14 Ben Cousins
15 Matthew Richardson
16 Scott Camporeale
18 Jarrod Molloy
19 Michael O'Loughlin
20 Clive Waterhouse
22 Wayne Campbell
23 Justin Leppitsch
24 Matthew Allan
25 Peter Burgoyne
26 Peter Bell
27 Andrew McKay
34 Ben Hart

Jim Stynes Medal – Jason Akermanis

1998 (Tour to Ireland)
 Stephen Silvagni – Goalkeeper
 Ben Hart
 David Neitz
 Shane Crawford
 Rohan Smith
 Sean Wellman
 Nigel Smart
 Mark Ricciuto
 Nathan Buckley
 Robert Harvey
 Wayne Carey – Captain
 Brad Johnson
 Nathan Eagleton
 Jeff Farmer
 Anthony Stevens
 Matthew Lloyd
 Peter Everitt
 Jim Stynes
 Scott Camporeale
 Wayne Campbell
 Nick Holland
 Shaun Rehn
 Todd Viney

Jim Stynes Medal – Stephen Silvagni

Australian honour roll

Honour roll

Most Australian caps

Note: includes players' caps from 1984 – 2014.

Guernsey
The 1984–1990 Australian teams wore a traditional Australian rules sleeveless guernsey in plain gold. The teams of 1998–2011 wore a predominantly navy blue Gaelic football style guernsey, with either a green or gold v or green and gold sash. The Indigenous All-Stars team which represented Australia in 2013 wore a unique Indigenous-styled guernsey. Ahead of the 2014 test match, the Australian guernsey was significantly altered, in favour of a mix of green and gold, with the traditional v-shape.

See also
 Australia women's international rules football team
 International rules football
 Jim Stynes Medal

References

 
International rules football
International rules football teams
1984 establishments in Australia
Sports clubs established in 1984